Hook, Line and Sinker is an Australian fishing television program, produced by HLS Productions in Hobart, Tasmania and is hosted by Nick Duigan and Andrew Hart. The program premiered in 2001 and is broadcast nationally on the Southern Cross Television network. The show is aired on Saturday afternoons and runs for 30 minutes.

The show features some light entertainment and comical behaviour from the hosts as well as serious fishing news and stories from around Australia.

The University of Tasmania presents a regular segment on the show called The Deep End. The segment features research and material from the Marine Research Laboratories at the Hobart campus and the National Centre for Marine Conservation & Resource Sustainability at the Launceston campus.

See also

References

External links
 

Southern Cross Television original programming
Fishing television series
2001 Australian television series debuts
2010s Australian television series
Television shows set in Tasmania
Recreational fishing in Australia
Australian sports television series